The following outline is provided as an overview of and topical guide to libertarianism, a political philosophy that upholds liberty as its principal objective. As a result, libertarians seek to maximize autonomy and freedom of choice, emphasizing political freedom, voluntary association and the primacy of individual judgment.

Nature of libertarianism 
 Supports
 Economic freedom – the freedom to receive the full value of one's labour, or to produce, trade and consume any goods and services acquired without the use of force, fraud or theft
 Egalitarianism – the idea that all humans are equal in fundamental worth or social status
 Individual responsibility – the idea that a person is responsible for their own actions and their own lives
 Personal development – methods, skills and strategies by which individuals can effectively direct their own activities toward the achievement of objectives and includes goal setting, decision making, focusing, planning, scheduling, task tracking, self-evaluation, self-intervention, self-development and so on
 Self-governance – the idea that a person or group are able to exercise all of the necessary functions of power without intervention from any authority which they cannot themselves alter
 Self-ownership – the concept of property in one's own person, expressed as the moral or natural right of a person to be the exclusive controller of his or her own body and life
 Social responsibility – the idea that a person is responsible for and has an obligation to act in the best interests of their community
 Voluntary association – a group of individuals who enter into an agreement as teers to form a body (or organization) to accomplish a purpose

 Rejects
 Authoritarianism – a form of social organization characterized by submission to authority
 Coercion – the practice of forcing another party to behave in an intary manner (whether through action or inaction) by use of threats or intimidation or some other form of pressure or force
 Imperialism – as defined by the Dictionary of Human Geography, it is "the creation and/or maintenance of an unequal economic, cultural and territorial relationship, usually between states and often in the form of an empire, based on domination and subordination"

 Debates
 Abortion
 Anarcho-capitalism and minarchism and libertarian municipalism
 Capital punishment
 Consequentialism vs. deontology
 Employee–employer relationship vs. workers' self-management and worker cooperatives
 Foreign intervention
 Free-market environmentalism
 Free-market and laissez-faire capitalism vs. communism and socialism (including both free-market and laissez-faire socialism and market abolitionist, decentralized-planned economy)
 Immigration
 Intellectual property
 Law
 Objectivism
 Political alliances
 State

Branches and schools of libertarianism 
Libertarianism has many overlapping schools of thought, all focused on smaller government and greater individual responsibility. As interpretations of the non-aggression principle vary, some libertarian schools of thought promote the total abolition of government while others promote a smaller government which does not initiate force. Some seek private ownership of all property and natural resources while others promote communal ownership of all natural resources and varying degrees of private property.
 Agorism
 Anarcho-capitalism
 Autarchism
 Bleeding-heart libertarianism
 Christian libertarianism
 Civil libertarianism
 Classical liberalism
 Consequentialist libertarianism
 Crypto-anarchism
 Deontological libertarianism
 Free-market anarchism
 Geolibertarianism
 Green libertarianism
 Individualist anarchism
 Laissez-faire
 Left-wing market anarchism
 Liberalism
 Liberism
 Libertarian Christianity
 Libertarian conservatism
 Libertarian paternalism
 Libertarian transhumanism
 Market liberalism
 Market socialism
 Minarchism
 Paleolibertarianism
 Panarchism
 Philosophical anarchism
 Propertarianism
 Right-libertarianism
 Social libertarianism
 Voluntaryism

Origins of libertarianism 
 Anarchism
 History of anarchism
 Anarcho-communism
 Individualist anarchism
 Social anarchism
 Anti-Federalism
 Jeffersonian democracy
 Aristotelianism
 Thomism
 Free market economics
 Austrian School of Economics
 Chicago School of Economics
 Classical economics
 French Liberal School
 Levellers
 Liberalism
 History of liberalism
 Age of Enlightenment
 Classical liberalism
 Libertarian communism
 Libertarian socialism
 Metaphysical libertarianism
 Natural law
 Radicalism
 Classical radicalism
 Transcendentalism

Libertarian theory and politics 
 Criticism of libertarianism
 Debates within libertarianism
 Libertarian Party (disambiguation)
 Libertarianism in Hong Kong
 Libertarianism in South Africa
 Libertarianism in the United Kingdom
 Libertarianism in the United States
 List of libertarian political parties

Libertarian ideals 
These are concepts which although not necessarily exclusive to libertarianism are significant in historical and modern libertarian circles.

 Autonomy
 Civil liberties
 Civil society
 Co-operative economics
 Counter-economics
 Decentralization
 Economic freedom
 Economic secession
 Free market
 Free speech
 Free trade
 Free will
 Freedom of association
 Freedom of contract
 Homestead principle
 Individualism
 Laissez-faire
 Law of equal liberty
 LGBT rights
 Liberty
 Limited government
 Methodological individualism
 Mutual liberty
 Natural rights
 Night watchman state
 Non-aggression
 Non-interventionism
 Non-politics
 Non-violence
 Non-voting
 Participatory economics
 Personal development
 Personalism
 Private defense agency
 Polycentric law
 Property
 Right to keep and bear arms
 Self-governance
 Self-ownership
 Spontaneous order
 Stateless society
 Subjective theory of value
 Subsidiarity
 Tax resistance
 Title-transfer theory of contract
 Voluntary association
 Voluntary society

Individuals who have influenced libertarianism

Anarchists 
 Émile Armand (1872–1962) – influential individualist anarchist
 Mikhail Bakunin (1814–1876) – theorist of collectivist anarchism who influenced the development of left-libertarianism
 William Godwin (1756–1836) – the first modern proponent of anarchism, whose political views are outlined in his book Political Justice
 Karl Hess (1923–1993) – libertarian socialist and tax resistor
 Thomas Hodgskin (1787–1869) – author of works on anti-capitalism, individualist anarchism and libertarian socialism
 Pierre-Joseph Proudhon (1809–1865) – the first self-described anarchist and founder of mutualism
 Lysander Spooner (1808–1887) – notable individualist anarchist and founder of the American Letter Mail Company
 Max Stirner (1806–1856) – founder of egoist anarchism
 Benjamin Tucker (1854–1939) – a leading theorist of individualist anarchism in the 19th century
 Josiah Warren (1798–1874) – the first known American anarchist and author of the anarchist periodical The Peaceful Revolutionist

Economists 
 Frédéric Bastiat (1801–1850) – 19th century creator of the concept of opportunity cost
 Peter Bauer (1915–2002) – wrote about developmental economics
 Eugen von Böhm-Bawerk (1851–1914) – contributor to the Austrian School
 Richard Cantillon (–1734) – wrote about prices, value, and markets
 Charles Dunoyer (1786–1862) – French economist and political scholar
 David D. Friedman (b. 1945) – American economist
 Robin Hahnel (b. 1946) – modern participatory economics scholar and libertarian socialist
 Floyd Harper (1905–1973) – founded the Institute for Humane Studies
 Hans-Hermann Hoppe (b. 1949) – developed extensive work on argumentation ethics
 Israel M. Kirzner (b. 1930) – British economist
 Frank H. Knight (1855–1972) – American professor
 Carl Menger (1840–1921) – founder of Austrian School economics
 John Stuart Mill (1806–1873) – British  philosopher and political economist, wrote On Liberty
 Ludwig von Mises (1881–1972) – philosopher, Austrian School economist, sociologist and classical liberal
 Gustave de Molinari (1819–1912) – French commentator on political economy
 Franz Oppenheimer (1864–1943) – German sociologist and economist
 Vincent Ostrom (1919–2012) – American educator and political economist
 David Ricardo (1772–1823) – British classical economist
 Murray Rothbard (1926–1995) – founder of anarcho-capitalism and a leading Austrian School economist
 Jean-Baptiste Say (1767–1832) – French political economist
 Joseph Schumpeter (1883–1950) – Moravian-born Austrian economist
 Nassau William Senior (1790–1864) – British economist
 Julian Simon (1932–1998) – American economist
 Adam Smith (1723–1790) – British political economist and philosopher
 Thomas Sowell (b. 1930) – American economist and social theorist
 William Graham Sumner (1840–1910) – American economist and sociologist
 Antoine Destutt de Tracy (1754–1836) – French economist and political theorist
 Gordon Tullock (1922–2014) – American economist and sociologist
 Anne Robert Jacques Turgot (1727–1781) – French economist and statesman
 Knut Wicksell (1851–1926) – Swedish economist

 Nobel Laureates
 Gary Becker (1930–2014) – who wrote about human behavior
 James M. Buchanan (1919–2013) – worked on public choice theory
 Ronald H. Coase (1910–2013) – studied transaction costs
 Milton Friedman (1912–2006) – monetarist economist, supported economic deregulation and privatization
 Friedrich Hayek (1899–1992) – Austrian School economist, notable for his political work The Road to Serfdom
 Elinor Ostrom (1933–2012) – common pool resource theorist and environmentalist
 George J. Stigler (1911–1991) – Chicago School economist

Legal and political figures
 John Adams (1735–1826) – drafted the American Declaration of Independence
 Étienne de La Boétie (1530–1563) – French judge and writer, early advocate of civil disobedience and nonviolent resistance
 Edmund Burke (1792–1797) – influential liberal conservative
 Ed Clark (b. 1930) – lawyer and US Libertarian Party politician
 Richard Cobden (1804–1865) – Anti-Corn Law League figure (opposing tariffs)
 Edward Coke (1552–1634) – British MP and legal scholar
 Charles Comte (1782–1837) – French political and legal scholar
 Marquis de Condorcet (1743–1794) – author and liberal reformer during the French Revolution
 Benjamin Constant (1767–1830) – figure during the French Revolution who argued for constitutional limits on power
 Albert Venn Dicey (1835–1922) – scholar of British constitutional law
 Denis Diderot (1713–1784) – French legal scholar
 Richard A. Epstein (b. 1943) – American law professor and legal theorist
 Adam Ferguson (1723–1816) – influenced the Scottish Enlightenment
 William Ewart Gladstone (1809–1898) – British political figure
 Barry Goldwater (1909–1998) – US Senator and presidential candidate
 Auberon Herbert (1836–1906) – British writer, MP, and founder of the doctrine of Voluntaryism
 John Hospers (1918–2011) – American philosopher and Libertarian Party political candidate
 Thomas Jefferson (1743–1826) – American president
 Roger Lea MacBride (1929–1995) – American writer and US Libertarian Party presidential nominee
 James Madison (1750–1836) – American president
 Henry Sumner Maine (1822–1888) – British legal scholar
 George Mason (1725–1792) – American Revolutionary War figure
 Tonie Nathan (1923–2014) – American media commentator and Libertarian Party vice-presidential election candidate
 Thomas Paine (1737–1809) – American Revolutionary War figure
 Ron Paul (b. 1935) – American politician and presidential candidate (1988, 2008 and 2012)
 Richard Posner (b. 1939) – American judge and legal theorist
 Roscoe Pound (1870–1964) – American legal theorist
 John Rawls (1921–2002) – American legal theorist
 Third Earl of Shaftesbury (1671–1713) – English politician, philosopher, and writer
 Algernon Sidney (1623–1683) – British statesman and philosopher
 Robert A. Taft (1889–1953) – US Senator and conservative politician
 George Washington (1732–1799) – American president
 William Wilberforce (1759–1833) – British politician, social activist, and philanthropist

Objectivists 
 Nathaniel Branden (1930–2014) – influenced Ayn Rand
 Leonard Peikoff (b. 1933) – founder of the Ayn Rand Institute and Rand's designated intellectual heir
 Ayn Rand (1905–1982) – the creator of the philosophy of Objectivism

Others 
 Thomas Aquinas (–1274) – theologian who wrote about individual autonomy
 Aristotle – Greek philosopher and polymath whose philosophy stressed personal virtue
 Jeremy Bentham (1748–1832) – English 'father of utilitarianism'
 Murray Bookchin (1921–2006) – founder of libertarian municipalism and social ecology theorist
 John Bright (1811–1889) – British radical who promoted free trade
 John Brown (1800–1859) – abolitionist leader
 Henry Thomas Buckle (1821–1862) – historian who defended laissez-faire trade
 Jean-Jacques Burlamaqui (1694–1748) – wrote about natural law
 Roy Childs (1949–1992) – essayist and critic
 Frank Chodorov (1887–1966) – member of the American Old Right
 Noam Chomsky (b. 1928) – linguist and social critic
 Cicero – Roman jurist and classical humanist
 Frederick Douglass (1818–1895) – American abolitionist
 Ralph Waldo Emerson (1803–1882) – American founder of Transcendentalism
 Antony Fisher (1915–1988) – British philanthropist and founder of the Atlas Network
 Michel Foucault (1926–1984) – French social theorist
 William Lloyd Garrison (1805–1879) – American abolitionist
 Henry Hazlitt (1894–1993) – American journalist and writer
 Robert Heinlein (1907–1988) – science fiction writer
 Thomas Hobbes (1588–1676) – political theorist who wrote Leviathan
 Wilhelm von Humboldt (1767–1835) – German political theorist who wrote The Limits of State Action
 David Hume (1711–1776) – Scottish Enlightenment author of the Treatise of Human Nature
 Francis Hutcheson (1694–1746) – figure in the Scottish Enlightenment
 Jane Jacobs (1916–2006) – Canadian writer on urban planning
 Bertrand de Jouvenel (1903–1987) – French writer on political and social thought
 Immanuel Kant (1724–1804) – German Enlightenment philosopher
 Rose Wilder Lane (1886–1968) – American writer
 Lao Tzu – argued for limited government
 Bartolomé de las Casas (1474–1566) – Spanish historian
 Robert LeFevre (1911–1986) – American educator, founder of Rampart College
 William Leggett (1801–1839) – American journalist
 John Locke (1632–1704) – philosopher, generally regarded as the 'father of liberalism'
 Lord Acton (1834–1902) – historian
 Thomas Babington Macaulay (1800–1859) – British classical liberal
 Bernard Mandeville (1670–1733) – Dutch-born, London based physician
 H. L. Mencken (1880–1956) – American writer
 Frank S. Meyer (1909–1972) – American writer and founder of National Review
 John Milton (1608–1674) – British poet and political commentator
 Michel de Montaigne (1533–1592) – writer during the French Renaissance
 Montesquieu (1689–1755) – French social commentator and political thinker
 Charles Murray (b. 1943) – American political scientist
 Friedrich Nietzsche (1844–1900) – German political writer
 Albert Jay Nock (1870–1945) – American political writer
 Robert Nozick (1938–2002) – philosopher and author of Anarchy, State, and Utopia
 José Ortega y Gasset (1883–1955) – Spanish philosopher and essayist
 George Orwell (1903–1950) – British writer and social analyst
 Isabel Paterson (1886–1961) – American writer
 Karl Popper (1902–1994) – Vienna-born British social theorist
 Richard Price (1723–1791) – British moral and political theorist
 Leonard E. Read (1898–1983) – American writer and author of I, Pencil
 Jean-Jacques Rousseau (1712–1778) – French Enlightenment philosopher
 Herbert Spencer (1820–1903) – biologist, sociologist and philosopher
 Thomas Szasz (1920–2012) – Hungarian-born American physician and writer
 Henry David Thoreau (1817–1862) – philosopher of American transcendentalism and anarcho-pacifism
 Alexis de Tocqueville (1805–1859) – French-born political theorist
 Voltaire (1694–1778) – French philosopher, historian, and writer
 Robert Anton Wilson (1932–2007) – author of The Illuminatus! Trilogy
 Mary Wollstonecraft (1759–1797) – British writer

See also 

 Anarcho-syndicalism
 Anti-state
 Anti-war
 Fusionism
 Libertarian Democrat
 Libertarian Republican
 List of libertarian organizations

 Categories
 :Category:Libertarianism by country
 :Category:Libertarianism by form
 :Category:Libertarians by nationality

External links 

 "Libertarianism". Encyclopædia Britannica.   
 
 

Libertarianism
Libertarianism